Maria Isabel Barroso Salgado Alencar (2 August 1960 – 16 November 2022) was a Brazilian volleyball player and coach. She played for the Brazilian national team, at the 1986 FIVB Volleyball Women's World Championship.

Salgado was mother of Pedro Solberg Salgado, Maria Clara Salgado and Carolina Solberg Salgado, all of whom are beach volleyball players. She died from acute respiratory distress syndrome in São Paulo on 16 November 2022, at the age of 62.

References

External links
 

1960 births
2022 deaths
Volleyball players from Rio de Janeiro (city)
Brazilian women's beach volleyball players
Brazilian women's volleyball players
Brazilian volleyball coaches
Olympic volleyball players of Brazil
Volleyball players at the 1980 Summer Olympics
Volleyball players at the 1984 Summer Olympics